Shahid Madani Metro Station is a station in Tehran Metro Line 2. It is located in Ayatollah Madani Avenue. It is between Sarsabz Metro Station and Imam Hossein Metro Station.

References

Tehran Metro stations